United Nations Security Council resolution 1465, adopted unanimously on 13 February 2003, after reaffirming the principles of the United Nations Charter and Resolution 1373 (2001), the council condemned the bomb attack outside the El Nogal Club in Bogotá, Colombia on 7 February 2003.

The Security Council reaffirmed the need to combat threats to international peace and security caused by terrorist acts and condemned the bomb attack in the Colombian capital in which many people died and people injured. It expressed sympathy and condolences to the families of the victims and the people and government of Colombia.

The resolution called upon all states to co-operate with and provide assistance to the Colombian authorities to bring the perpetrators to justice in accordance with their obligations under Resolution 1373. Finally, the council concluded by expressing its determination to combat all forms of terrorism.

See also
 2003 El Nogal Club bombing
 Colombian armed conflict (1964–present)
 List of United Nations Security Council Resolutions 1401 to 1500 (2002–2003)

References

External links
 
Text of the Resolution at undocs.org

 1465
2003 in Colombia
 1465
 1465
February 2003 events